Dainkognubma is a village in the Tibet Autonomous Region of China with a latitude (DMS) of 32°26'N and a longitude of 97°58'E. It lies at an altitude of 4,039 metres (13,254 feet).

Other nearby villages

See also 
 List of towns and villages in Tibet

 

Populated places in Tibet